Air chief marshal (abbreviated as ACM) is the highest active rank of the Royal Australian Air Force and was created as a direct equivalent of the British Royal Air Force rank of air chief marshal.  It is also considered a four-star rank. The only time the rank is held is when the Chief of the Defence Force is an Air Force officer.

Air chief marshal is a higher rank than air marshal and is a lower rank than Marshal of the Royal Australian Air Force, which has only ever been awarded as an honorary rank. Air chief marshal is a direct equivalent of admiral in the Royal Australian Navy and general in the Australian Army.

Insignia
The insignia worn on the uniform is three light blue bands (each on a slightly wider black band) over a light blue band on a black broad band.

Australian air chief marshals may also fly an officer distinguishing flag.  For air chief marshals this comprises five horizontal stripes which from top to bottom are coloured: dark blue, light blue, red (double thickness), light blue and dark blue with four stars imposed in a line on the red stripe.

Australian air chief marshals
With the establishment of the Australian Air Board on 9 November 1920, Australian Air Corps officers dropped their army ranks in favour of those based on the Royal Air Force. However, it was not until 1965, when Frederick Scherger became Chairman of the Chiefs of Staff Committee and was promoted to air chief marshal, that an RAAF officer attained the rank.

Throughout the history of the RAAF, only four of its officers have held the rank:

See also

Ranks of the RAAF
Australian Defence Force ranks and insignia
Air force officer rank insignia
Douglas Evill, an Australian born officer who reached the rank of air chief marshal in the RAF

References

Royal Australian Air Force
Military ranks of Australia
Australia